Gang Related is an American action drama television series that aired on Fox from May 22 to August 14, 2014. The network placed the original series order on May 8, 2013, for 13 episodes. On September 2, 2014, Fox cancelled the series.

Plot
The series follows the personal and professional lives of the members of the elite Los Angeles Police Department's multi-agency Gang Task Force as they take on the city's most dangerous gangs, including one with which a task force member has ties.

Opening narration: (by Ramon Rodriguez)

Cast

Main cast
 Ramon Rodriguez as Ryan Lopez: an LAPD detective and former U.S. Army Ranger who was taken in and raised by the Acosta family at a young age after the death of his father at age ten. He was born in a poor town in Mexico, and moved to the United States illegally with his new family at that time. 
 Jay Hernandez as Daniel Acosta: son of the Acosta family who is working as an investment banker and is Ryan's childhood best friend.
 RZA as Cassius Green: DEA Agent and Ryan's second partner.
 Sung Kang as Tae Kim: FBI Agent and Veronica's partner. He has a sister, who suffered a brain injury and lives in a long-term care facility.
 Inbar Lavi as Veronika "Vee" Dotsen: ICE Agent and Tae's partner. She was stuck by a needle and is uncertain if she will be HIV positive. Her brother, Anton, is in prison for life. They are Russian.
 Rey Gallegos as Carlos Acosta: older son of Acosta family who is a lieutenant of the "Los Angelicos" gang.
 Shantel VanSanten as Jessica "Jess" Mary Chapel: Assistant District Attorney of Los Angeles County who is also Sam Chapel's daughter and Ryan's girlfriend.
 Cliff Curtis as Javier Acosta: Head of the Los Angelicos and patriarch of the Acosta family. His parents were illegally working at a restaurant when it burned down and the illegal workers all died. Javier and other people still in the basement escaped, but not his parents. 
 Terry O'Quinn as Sam Chapel: Head of the LAPD Gang Task Force and father of Jessica Chapel. Chapel goes rogue at times to achieve justice.

Recurring cast
 Emilio Rivera as Tio Gordo: right-hand man of the Los Angelicos
 Jay Karnes as Paul Carter: an LAPD Internal Affairs detective investigating the circumstances surrounding the death of Ryan's partner
Konstantin Lavysh as Anton Dotsen: brother of Vee Dotsen
 Philip Anthony-Rodriguez as Billy Cabrera: undercover agent working at Daniel's bank
Lela Loren as Silvia: Daniel's fiancée, she is implied to have lingering feelings for Ryan. She was Ryan's girlfriend before he joined the Army. They went their separate ways. Her name is tattooed on his arm. When he came back, she was with Daniel.
 Amaury Nolasco as Matias: killer working for the Metas. He's famous for using his signature sledgehammer in executions.

Episodes

Critical reception
Reviews for the show were mixed. It holds a 41% approval rating with an average score of 5.69/10 on review aggregator site Rotten Tomatoes. The consensus states: "Gang Related focuses more on being dark and edgy than delivering an original narrative, resulting in a fairly ordinary cop drama." On Metacritic, it has a score of 52 out of 100, indicating "mixed or average reviews".

Dorothy Rabinowitz at The Wall Street Journal wrote: "the writing is sharp, the atmosphere thick with tension from, among other things, car and foot chases". In contrast, The Hollywood Reporters Tim Goodman wrote: "it's pretty clear right away that you're dealing with a pile of clichés that, pushed together and financed, can never be more than dreadful".

Development
In January 2013, Fox announced that it had received a pilot order for the project.

In February 2013, Ramon Rodriguez was the first to be cast as the protagonist Ryan Lopez - a gang member sent in to infiltrate the LAPD. Shortly after, Sung Kang was cast in the role of Tae Kim, Asian gang specialist on loan from the FBI who refuses to celebrate Ryan's achievements because he considers Ryan's tactics dangerous and wasteful. Jay Hernandez later joined the cast as Daniel Acosta, gang lord Javier Acosta's son, and Ryan's best friend since childhood.

In March 2013, RZA and Cliff Curtis were then added to the cast with Curtis cast in the role of Javier Acosta, the head of one of the most dangerous gangs in Los Angeles. RZA was signed onto the role as Cassius Green Ryan's partner and best friend on the Gang Task Force originally from the tough streets of Oakland. Shantel vanSanten was cast in the days following as a doctor who treats Ryan for his bullet wound injuries and the daughter of the gang task force's captain. Tom Berenger was originally cast as Sam Chapel, a tough, dynamic police chief who oversees the Gang Task Force but was later replaced by Terry O'Quinn.

On May 8, 2013, Fox officially picked up Gang Related to series for 13 episodes.

References

External links
 
 

2010s American crime drama television series
2010s American police procedural television series
2014 American television series debuts
2014 American television series endings
American action television series
English-language television shows
Fictional portrayals of the Los Angeles Police Department
Fox Broadcasting Company original programming
Television series by 20th Century Fox Television
Television shows set in Los Angeles
Works about Mexican drug cartels
Television series by Imagine Entertainment